Reverend Soundsystem or RSS are an English 'indiestep' band that formed in Sheffield in 2010. The band's vocalist Jon McClure had been playing under the Reverend Soundsystem pseudonym for some time in between Reverend and The Makers albums, and he recruited his Makers-bandmate and wife Laura McClure to join him, with Ocelot and Maticmouth Sheffield MC and former classmate of Jon.

History
Jon McClure had hosted a monthly clubnight on the first Saturday of every month named "Reverend Soundsystem" at The Plug in Sheffield, and has also hosted one event at Manchester's Po Na Na. The Soundsystem has featured a number of guest DJs such as Mani (Stone Roses/Primal Scream), Peter Hook (New Order), the late Tony Wilson (Factory Records), Andy Nicholson (ex-Arctic Monkeys), Chris McClure (face of the Arctic Monkeys debut album cover (Whatever People Say I Am, That's What I'm Not) and brother of Jon), Terry Hall (The Specials), Milburn, Bez and Arctic Monkeys as well as live performances from The Sunshine Underground, Gas Club, Stoney, 747s, The Hosts and White Rose Movement.

Current activity and debut single
McClure set up the band and RSS began touring the UK in 2010 for the "Boxfreshers" event. In September, Laura McClure revealed the band would release a single titled "Wife Her Up" which will be released on 22 November. The band have been playing house parties up and down the country and Laura stated there would be more of these to come, but didn't expand on the possibility of a debut album.

Discography

Extended plays
"Wife Her Up"/"Rude" EP (released 14 February 2011)

Members
Official members
Jon McClure – vocals
Laura McClure
Maticmouth
Ocelot

References

English indie rock groups